Chryseobacterium piperi  is a Gram-negative, rod-shaped and non-motile bacteria from the genus of Chryseobacterium which has been isolated from the Loyalsock Creek in Montoursville in the United States.

References

Further reading

External links
Type strain of Chryseobacterium piperi at BacDive -  the Bacterial Diversity Metadatabase

piperi
Bacteria described in 2011